Marcus "Max" Aardema (born 11 February 1963) is a Dutch politician representing the Party for Freedom. He has been a member of the States of Friesland since 10 March 2011 and a member of the Senate, where he is temporarily replacing Martin van Beek, since 31 October 2017.

References

External links 
 Max Aardema at the website of the Senate

1963 births
Living people
21st-century Dutch politicians
Members of the Provincial Council of Friesland
Members of the Senate (Netherlands)
Party for Freedom politicians
People from Opsterland